Éder Daniel Munive Royero (born 17 September 1989 in Valledupar, Colombia) is a Colombian footballer who plays as a defender for Colombian Categoría Primera B club Atlético Huila.

References

External links
 
 

1989 births
Living people
Colombian footballers
Association football defenders
Categoría Primera A players
Envigado F.C. players
C.D. Malacateco players
C.D. Walter Ferretti players
C.D. Marathón players
Leones F.C. footballers
Atlético Huila footballers
Colombian expatriate footballers
Colombian expatriate sportspeople in Guatemala
Expatriate footballers in Guatemala
Colombian expatriate sportspeople in Nicaragua
Expatriate footballers in Nicaragua
Colombian expatriate sportspeople in Honduras
Expatriate footballers in Honduras
People from Valledupar